Rear Admiral M Shafiul Azam, NUP, ndc, psc (born 14 October 1964) is a retired two star admiral of Bangladesh Navy. He was Assistant Chief of naval Staff (Materiel). He also held the post of CSD at Commodore Superintendent Dockyard.

Early life and education

Azam was born on 14 October 1964 at Nilphamari district. After completing his secondary school certificate he joined Bangladesh Navy as officer cadet on 15 October 1982. Later he got commissioned in Bangladesh Navy at Engineering Branch on 15 April 1985. M Shafiul Azam completed his engineering degree from BUET at Naval Architecture & Marine Engineering. Later he did various specialization at home & abroad. He did his Marine Engineering specialization course from the Royal Naval Engineering College. He also did his first Staff Course from the Defense Services Command and Staff College, Mirpur and later completed his second staff course, i.e. Admirals Staff Course, in the Military Staff College of Germany (Fürungsakademie der Budeswehr). Later he completed his Masters of Defence Study (MDS) from the National University of Bangladesh and Masters of Strategic and Development Studies (MSDS) from the Bangladesh University of Professionals respectively.

Career
Azam served in numerous position during his service tenure. He served as Engineer Officer, Senior Engineer Officer at different warships and craft. he` also served in Staff Officer of the Engineering Directorate at the NHQ. Before appointing as Commodore Superintendent Dockyard at CSD Organization he served as the Director of Naval Engineering. IN his service tenure he also served as instructor at Bangladesh Naval Academy and Defence Staff College respectively. He had retired from active service on 13 October, 2022.

Personal life 
Rear Admiral AZAM is married to Dr. Rejina Begum, a Radiologist by profession. The couple is blessed with a Daughter and a son.

References

1964 births
Living people
Bangladeshi Navy admirals
Bangladesh University of Professionals alumni
Bangladesh University of Engineering and Technology alumni